Orania dharmai is a species of sea snail, a marine gastropod mollusk in the family Muricidae, the murex snails or rock snails.

Description

Distribution
This marine species occurs off Sumatra and Borneo, Indonesia;

References

External links
 Houart, R. (1995). The Ergalataxinae (Gastropoda, Muricidae) from the New Caledonia region with some comments on the subfamily and the description of thirteen new species from the Indo-West Pacific. Bulletin du Muséum National d'Histoire Naturelle, Paris. ser. 4, 16 (A, 2-4): 245-297

Gastropods described in 1995
Orania (gastropod)